Percy Stickney Grant (1860–1927) was an American Episcopal priest.

Grant was born in Boston and was educated at Harvard University (AB, 1883; AM, 1886) and at the Episcopal Theological School in Cambridge, Massachusetts (BD, 1886). He was a curate of the church of the Ascension (1886) and incumbent of St. Mark's Church (1887–1893; both in Fall River, Massachusetts) and was also rector at Swansea, Massachusetts, in 1890–1893.

In 1893 he became incumbent of the Church of the Ascension in New York City. He became known for his support of socialism and for his "forum" for the expression of views on labor and living conditions. Advocates of all political and social doctrines were permitted to speak freely. This was widely criticized and finally, in 1923, following action taken by Bishop William T. Manning, the forum was greatly modified in its character. He also came in controversy with Manning on the question of divorce. He became engaged to Rita de Acosta Lydig who had been divorced. Manning refused to authorize the marriage and it did not take place. In June 1924, he resigned his rectorship.

Published works
 Ad Matrem (1905)
 The Search of Belisarius (1907)
 Observations in Asia (1908)
 Socialism and Christianity (1910)
 The Return of Odysseus (1912)
 Fair Play for the Worker (1918)
 Essays and Poems (1922)
 The Religion of Main Street (1923)

References

Further reading

External links
 
 Johns Hopkins University libraries page (source for death year)
]

1860 births
1927 deaths
American Christian socialists
American Episcopal priests
American male non-fiction writers
American political writers
Anglican socialists
Clergy from Boston
Episcopal Divinity School alumni
Harvard University alumni
Religious leaders from New York City